The Pact of Misenum was a treaty to end the naval blockade of the Italian Peninsula during the Sicilian revolt. The pact was signed in 39 BC between Sextus Pompeius and the members of the Second Triumvirate – specifically, Mark Antony and Gaius Julius Caesar, the later Roman Emperor Augustus. The triumvirs allowed Sextus Pompeius to retain his control of Sicily and Sardinia and also granted him control of Corsica and the Peloponnesus.

They also promised him a future augurate and consulship for 33 BC. In exchange, Pompeius agreed to end his blockade of Italy, supply Rome with grain and halt his piracy.

The pact later fell apart when one of the triumvirs, Mark Antony, refused to cede control of Achaea. Pompeius then resumed hostilities against Rome before being defeated in 36 BC at the naval Battle of Naulochus by the Republican general Marcus Vipsanius Agrippa.

References

1st century BC in Italy
Treaties of the Roman Republic
39 BC
1st-century BC treaties
1st century BC in the Roman Republic